Landscape with a Pig and a Horse or Landscape, La Dominique is a 1903 oil painting by Paul Gauguin. Since 1908 it has been in the collection of the Ateneum in Helsinki. One of his last works, it was painted on Hiva Oa island.

References

1903 paintings
Paintings in the collection of the Ateneum
Paintings by Paul Gauguin
Landscape paintings
Horses in art
Pigs in art